Metisella quadrisignatus, the four-spot sylph, is a butterfly in the family Hesperiidae. It is found in Sudan, Kenya, Tanzania and Malawi.

Subspecies
Metisella quadrisignatus quadrisignatus (southern Sudan, Kenya: from the south-east to the Chyulu Hills, Tanzania, Malawi)
Metisella quadrisignatus nanda Evans, 1937 (Kenya: highlands east of the Rift Valley)

References

Butterflies described in 1894
Heteropterinae
Butterflies of Africa